Interboro School District is a midsized, suburban public school district located in southeastern Pennsylvania, just outside Philadelphia in Delaware County. Interboro School District encompasses approximately 11 square miles. The district is made up of four communities: the boroughs of Glenolden, Norwood, and Prospect Park, and Tinicum Township. At one time the area was divided into separate school districts: Glen-Nor, Prospect Park, and Lester. In 1955 Glen-Nor and Prospect Park joined with Lester being included later. The first graduating class of Interboro High School was in 1956 with 125 members. According to 2000 federal census data, Interboro School District serves a resident population of 24,408. In 2009, the district residents’ per capita income was $19,983, while the median family income was $51,323. In the Commonwealth, the median family income was $49,501 and the United States median family income was $49,445, in 2010.

Schools

There are 6 schools in this district:

Interboro High School (grades 9–12)
Glenolden School (grades 1–8)
Norwood School (grades 1–8)
Prospect Park School (grades 1–8)
Tinicum School (grades 1–8)
Interboro Kindergarten Academy (grades K – transitional 1st grade)

References

External links

 Interboro School District

School districts in Delaware County, Pennsylvania